Aspects of Andrew Lloyd Webber is the second studio album by Australian singer Marina Prior featuring Melbourne Symphony Orchestra conducted by Brian Stacey. It was released in November 1992 and peaked at number 22 on the ARIA Albums Chart. The album was certified gold for shipment of 35000 copies.

The album is a tribute to the work of Andrew Lloyd Webber.  Prior had starred as Christine Daaé in the original Australian production of Lloyd Webber's The Phantom of the Opera, and had earlier appeared in the original Australian production of Cats.

At the ARIA Music Awards of 1993, the album was nominated for Best Adult Contemporary Album but lost to Don't Hold Back That Feeling by Andrew Pendlebury.

Track listing

 CD/ Cassette
 "I Don't Know How to Love Him" - from Jesus Christ Superstar
 "Half a Moment" - from By Jeeves
 "Seeing is Believing" - from Aspects of Love
 "Memory" - from Cats
 "Close Every Door" - from Joseph and the Amazing Technicolor Dreamcoat
 "Music of the Night" - from The Phantom of the Opera
 "Nothing Like You've Ever Known" - from Song and Dance
 "Amigos Para Siempre" - from 1992 Summer Olympics
 "Buenos Aires" - from Evita
 "Another Suitcase in Another Hall" - from Evita
 "Don't Cry for Me Argentina" - from Evita
 "Hosanna" - from Requiem
 "Pie Jesu"	- from Requiem
 "Unexpected Song" - from Song and Dance

Charts and certifications

Weekly charts

Certifications

Release history

References

1992 albums
Covers albums
Marina Prior albums
Sony Music Australia albums
Melbourne Symphony Orchestra albums
Andrew Lloyd Webber